Vasum intermedium is an extinct species of medium to large sea snail, a marine gastropod mollusk in the family Turbinellidae.

Description
The height of the shell: attains 65 mm.

Distribution
Fossils of this marine species have been found in Oligocene strata of the Adour Basin, France.

References

  Lozouet, P. (2021). Turbinelloidea, Mitroidea, Olivoidea, Babyloniidae et Harpidae (Gastropoda, Neogastropoda) de l'Oligocène supérieur (Chattien) du bassin de l'Adour (Sud-Ouest de la France). Cossmanniana. 23: 3-69.

External links
  Grateloup, J.P.S. (1832-1835). Tableau des coquilles fossiles qu'on rencontre dans les terrains calcaires tertiaires (faluns) des environs de Dax, département des Landes. Actes de la Société Linnéenne de Bordeaux. 5(3): 132-171
 Orbigny A. D. d'. (1850-1852). Prodrome de paléontologie stratigraphique universelle des animaux mollusques et rayonnés, faisant suite au cours élémentaire de paléontologie et de géologie stratigraphiques. Paris: Masson. vol. 1

intermedium
Gastropods described in 1832